Medina County is a county located in the U.S. state of Texas. As of the 2020 census, its population was 50,748. Its county seat is Hondo. The county is named for the Medina River. The extreme northern part of the county lies within the  Edwards Plateau, which elevates into the Texas Hill Country. The Medina Dam, the fourth largest in the nation when completed in 1913, is listed on the National Register of Historic Places.  The irrigation project, creating Medina Lake, was built by 1500 skilled workers who worked in shifts operating 24 hours a day to complete the dam in two years. Medina County is part of the San Antonio, TX Metropolitan Statistical Area.

History
The county is named after the Medina River, which was named in 1689 after the Spanish cartographer Pedro de Medina by the Spanish explorer Alonso de Leon, the first European to encounter the river. Because Pedro de Medina derived his surname from the Andalusian city of Medina-Sidonia, the name Medina comes from the Arabic for city.

The Texas Legislature formed Medina county on February 12, 1848, and enlarged it on February 1, 1850, using land taken from Bexar County. Castroville was the county seat, and the county erected the first permanent courthouse there in 1854. The county seat moved to Hondo in 1892, and a new courthouse was completed there in 1893.

Geography

Major highways
  Interstate 35
  U.S. Highway 90
  State Highway 16
  State Highway 132
  State Highway 173

Adjacent counties
 Bandera County (north)
 Bexar County (east)
 Atascosa County (southeast)
 Frio County (south)
 Uvalde County (west)

Demographics

Note: the US Census treats Hispanic/Latino as an ethnic category. This table excludes Latinos from the racial categories and assigns them to a separate category. Hispanics/Latinos can be of any race.

As of the census of 2000, there were 39,304 people, 12,880 households, and 10,136 families residing in the county.  The population density was 30 people per square mile (11/km2).  There were 14,826 housing units at an average density of 11 per square mile (4/km2).  The racial makeup of the county was 79.38% White, 2.20% Black or African American, 0.68% Native American, 0.33% Asian, 0.05% Pacific Islander, 14.48% from other races, and 2.88% from two or more races.  45.47% of the population were Hispanic or Latino of any race.

There were 12,880 households, out of which 39.10% had children under the age of 18 living with them, 63.20% were married couples living together, 11.10% had a female householder with no husband present, and 21.30% were non-families. 18.20% of all households were made up of individuals, and 8.20% had someone living alone who was 65 years of age or older.  The average household size was 2.91 and the average family size was 3.30.

In the county, the population was spread out, with 29.00% under the age of 18, 8.40% from 18 to 24, 28.70% from 25 to 44, 21.50% from 45 to 64, and 12.40% who were 65 years of age or older.  The median age was 34 years. For every 100 females, there were 105.60 males.  For every 100 females age 18 and over, there were 104.90 males.

The median income for a household in the county was $36,063, and the median income for a family was $40,288. Males had a median income of $27,045 versus $21,734 for females. The per capita income for the county was $15,210.  About 12.00% of families and 15.40% of the population were below the poverty line, including 19.80% of those under age 18 and 15.60% of those age 65 or over.

Communities

Cities

 Castroville
 Devine
 Hondo (county seat)
 LaCoste
 Lytle (mostly in Atascosa County and a small part in Bexar County)
 Natalia
 San Antonio (mostly in Bexar County and a small part in Comal County)

Census-designated places
 D'Hanis
 Lake Medina Shores (partly in Bandera County)

Unincorporated communities
 Dunlay
 Mico
 Pearson
 Rio Medina
 Yancey

Ghost towns
 New Fountain
 Quihi

Education
Most of La Salle County is served by the Cotulla Independent School District. The Dilley Independent School District serves a small portion of northwestern La Salle County.
 D'Hanis Independent School District
 Devine Independent School District
 Hondo Independent School District
 Lytle Independent School District
 Medina Valley Independent School District
 Natalia Independent School District
 Northside Independent School District
 Utopia Independent School District

The designated community college is Southwest Texas Junior College.

Gallery

Politics

See also

 National Register of Historic Places listings in Medina County, Texas
 Recorded Texas Historic Landmarks in Medina County

References

Further reading
 Holt, Jr., C.L.R. (1959). Geology and ground-water resources of Medina County, Texas [U.S. Geological Survey Water-Supply Paper 1422]. Washington, D.C.: U.S. Government Printing Office.
 Castro Colonies Heritage Association, The History of Medina County, Texas, Dallas, TX: National Share Graphics, 1983).
 Houston B. Eggen, History of Public Education in Medina County, Texas, 1848–1928 (M.A. thesis, University of Texas, 1950).
 Cyril Matthew Kuehne, S.M., Ripples from Medina Lake, San Antonio, TX: Naylor, 1966.
 Bobby D. Weaver, Castro's Colony: Empresario Development in Texas, 1842–1865, College Station, TX: Texas A&M University Press, 1985.

External links

 Medina County Profile from the Texas Association of Counties

 
1848 establishments in Texas
Populated places established in 1848
Greater San Antonio
Majority-minority counties in Texas